The Sri Lanka national rugby sevens team, known as the Tuskers (similar to their counterpart national rugby union team), represents Sri Lanka in men's international rugby sevens. They have competed in the Hong Kong Sevens since the 1980s. In 1989, veteran rugby commentator Bill McLaren mentions them in an article on the Hong Kong Sevens, saying that their team had players such as Kothalawala, Ekanayake and Lakshantha.

Current squad
Squad to 2014 Commonwealth Games:

Shenal Dias
Sudharshana Muthuthantri
Anuruddha Wilwara
Lawang Perera
Danuska Ranjan
Sandun Herath
Shehan Pathirana
Dinusha Chathuranga
Richard Dharmapala
Fazil Marija
Srinath Sooriyabandara
Mithun Hapugoda

Tournament history

Summer Olympics

Asian Games

Commonwealth Games

Hong Kong Sevens

1984 Hong Kong Sevens

2007 Hong Kong Sevens

Pool A matches -

 Fiji 45 - 0 Sri Lanka	
 Scotland 31 - 7 Portugal
 Scotland 53 - 21 Sri Lanka	
 Fiji 28 - 7 Portugal
 Portugal 47 - 7 Sri Lanka	
 Fiji 26 - 0 Scotland

2008 Hong Kong Sevens

Pool B matches -

2009 Hong Kong Sevens

Pool C matches -

2014 Hong Kong Sevens

Pool A matches -

 Kenya 41 - 0 Sri Lanka	
 Fiji 42 - 7 Wales
 Fiji 56 - 0 Sri Lanka	
 Kenya 7 - 10 Wales
 Wales 47 - 12 Sri Lanka	
 Fiji 43 - 5 Kenya

Sri Lanka Rugby 7s

See also
 Sri Lanka national rugby union team

References

 McLaren, Bill A Visit to Hong Kong in Starmer-Smith, Nigel & Robertson, Ian (eds) The Whitbread Rugby World '90 (Lennard Books, 1989)

National rugby sevens teams
Sri Lanka national rugby union team
Sri Lanka at the Commonwealth Games